Helena Public Schools is a public school district located in Helena, Montana, United States.

Schools
Elementary schools
 Broadwater Elementary School
 Bryant Elementary School
 Central Elementary School
 Four Georgians Elementary School
 Hawthorne Elementary School
 Jefferson Elementary School
 Jim Darcy Elementary School
 Kessler Elementary School
 Rossiter Elementary School
 Smith Elementary School
 Warren Elementary School

Middle schools
 C. R. Anderson Middle School
 Helena Middle School

High schools
 Capital High School
 Helena High School
 Project for Alternative Learning

References

Education in Lewis and Clark County, Montana
Helena, Montana
School districts in Montana